The Bremen Town Musicians is a 1969 Soviet musical animated film produced by Soyuzmultfilm, directed by Inessa Kovalevskaya and written by Yuri Entin and Vasily Livanov, with music by Gennady Gladkov. It is based on the characters of Brothers Grimm fairy-tale, Town Musicians of Bremen. The film became a cult hit in the Soviet Union because of its memorable musical soundtrack, which contains influences from Western rock and roll music. Two sequels were made, including On the Trail of the Bremen Town Musicians (1973) and The New Bremen Town Musicians (2000).

Plot

The cartoon focuses on a Donkey, a Dog, a Cat, and a Rooster and their leader, a Troubadour (possibly to represent a classical five-piece rock-band). At the start of the cartoon, the band sings about the joy of freedom, which they feel in their travels. They arrive in a palace and begin a show for the King and his subjects. They perform a variety of tricks. However, while the Troubadour is balancing upside-down on top of his animals, he and the Princess catch each other's eye; they both blush. The unexpected event derails the show, causing Donkey to shatter a window. The King furiously throws the band out of the palace and into the woods. 

Back on the road, Troubadour looks up at the moonlit sky and dreams of the Princess, seeing her face in the moon. As he sings, it is revealed that the Princess, too, is gazing at the moon thinking of him. Their translucent figures share a duet in the sky. Afterwards, they each sing, pulling the moon their way; it tilts to and fro until at last it is at its highest point in the sky.

Presumably at midnight, the band chances upon a stone hut housing a band of bandits. Their leader is a fortune teller with golden bracelets, heavy makeup, and a long black ponytail - likely a stereotype of Romani people. Shuffling a deck of playing cards, she sings about her desire to rob the king. The other crooks merrily join the song, drinking foaming mugs of beer and dancing together as they sing along. The woman dances atop her drum as the song speeds up into a ragtime, with a vision of fire behind her. Meanwhile, the crooks engage in a sword dance. She swooshes her shawl and shimmies her shoulders, laughing maniacally as the song concludes. Suddenly, the music stops as they are interrupted by Troubadour and the animals. They frighten the crooks with strange noises and a trenchcoat-like disguise. The crooks scramble out of the windows in fear, and the musicians take possession of the hut.

The next day, the King and his military escort are marching to a classified location when their road is blocked by Troubadour and his companions, who are disguised similarly to the crooks; they sing a song about being bandits. The group chases off the cowardly soldiers and capture the King, tying him to a post and running into his hut. The King trembles with fear, having a vision of knives slicing against each other. Unable to escape, the King sinks down in despair.

Troubadour then comes out of the hut as his regular self and plays a song on his guitar about how he would do anything for the King, especially if he could marry the King's daughter. The King notices the Troubadour and desperately gestures to be saved. Troubadour immediately runs into the hut and the house trembles as he appears to beat up the bandits within (in reality, he and his band are simply doing cartwheels and jumping jacks while throwing laundry out windows). At last the King is untied by the Troubadour's band, and thereby winning the King's favor. 

With the King rescued, the musicians lead a procession back to the palace. The guards attempt to reconcile with the King to no avail. The King formally introduces Troubadour to the Princess, implying they are to be wed. That night, the King throws a ball, where Troubadour and the Princess dance in modern ways that energize the other guests. Meanwhile, the animals are not allowed in the palace; they are forced to spend the night outside, unsuccessfully attempting to peer in through windows.

In the morning, the Rooster calls for Troubadour multiple times, sounding dejected towards the end. Hearing no answer, the animals pack up their things and leave the palace, beginning a solemn rendition of the song they sang in the opening. To their surprise, one of the verses is sung by outside voices: Troubadour and the Princess. Now reunited, Troubadour, the princess, and the animals set off into the unknown.

Cast 

 Oleg Anofriyev - Troubadour, the Rooster, the Dog, the Cat, Atamansha, the Robbers and the guards
 Elmira Zherzdeva - Princess
 Anatoly Gorokhov - The Donkey, the Robbers and the guards

Voice actors in other countries

Legacy 
A track from the film is available on Russian copies of the rhythm/dance game, Just Dance 2019 for 8th generation consoles. It became available as a Just Dance Unlimited exclusive for regions outside of Russia on December 20, 2018. The track is streamed through the Ubisoft servers.

See also
Cheburashka (1971), another musical Soviet film
The Flying Ship (film), a comparable Soviet musical-cartoon from 1979
History of Russian animation

References

External links 

The Bremen Town Musicians at Animator.ru
Cartoon with English subtitles (var2)

1969 animated films
1969 films
Films scored by Gennady Gladkov
Films based on The Town Musicians of Bremen
Russian animated fantasy films
Russian children's fantasy films
Russian musical fantasy films‎ 
Soviet animated films
Soviet children's fantasy films
Soviet musical-animated films
Soviet musical fantasy films
Soyuzmultfilm
Sung-through_musical films